The 2007–08 Serie D was the sixty edition of the top level Italian non-professional football championship. It represented the fifth tier in the Italian football league system.

It was composed by 162 teams divided into nine divisions of 18 teams each.

The regular Serie D season started September 2, 2007 and continued through to May 4, 2008 with each team playing 34 matches, two matches against every other team in the division. The nine division winners were automatically promoted to 2008–09 Lega Pro Seconda Divisione, while the two last-placed teams were automatically relegated to Eccellenza.

After the regular season was completed, teams placed 13 through to 16 in each division played a double-leg series (13 vs 16, 14 vs 15) where the winners remained in Serie D the following season and the two losers were also relegated to Eccellenza for a total of 4 relegations in each division, 36 in total for the league.

The nine division winners entered a tournament to determine the over-all Serie D champion and was awarded the Scudetto Dilettanti.

Teams placed second through fifth in each division entered a play-off tournament after the regular season as well. The results of the play-offs provided a list, starting with the winner, by which vacancies could be filled in Lega Pro Seconda Divisione, if teams in the professional leagues above Serie D run into financial difficulties or are penalized.

Events and results

Promotions 

On March 30, 2008, Alessandria from Girone A and Isola Liri from Girone G were mathematically ensured of the Serie D title in their respective divisions five weeks before the end of the regular season, thus winning promotion to Serie C2. To note, Isola Liri ensured a place in professional football for their first time. They were followed on April 13 by Girone D winners Figline, on April 20 by Itala San Marco and Giacomense, on April 27 by fallen giants Como and Cosenza. On May 4 Sangiustese and Aversa Normanna won the last two remaining Serie C2 spots, winning their respective divisions just on the final matchday.

In addition to the nine division winners, the top five teams in the promotional play-offs also won promotion to Lega Pro Seconda Divisione to fill vacancies.

Relegations 

Thirty-six teams were destined to be relegated to Eccellenza for the 2008–09 season. The two last-placed teams from each of the nine divisions were directly relegated - 18 in total. Of the 18 teams that lost in the relegation play-offs, nine were eventually selected to remain in Serie D for the 2008–09 season in order to fill the vacancies created when nine extra teams were called up from Serie D to Serie C2, now called Lega Pro Seconda Divisione.

The nine vacancies in Serie C2 were created by the bankruptcies and other financial problems of nine teams in total that played in Serie B, C1 & C2 in 2007–08. As teams moved up to fill the void, nine spaces were left to be filled in Serie C2. As mentioned, five teams that played in Serie D in 2007–08 received extra promotions, while four teams initially relegated from C2 were called back.

After the 162-team list was set for the 2008–09 season, the league decided to place four of the nine financially troubled teams of the upper leagues in Serie D as well, resulting in a 166-team Serie D league for next season.

Final standings

Legend

Girone A 
Teams from Piedmont & Liguria

Girone B 
Teams from Lombardy, Piedmont &Trentino-Alto Adige/Südtirol

Girone C 
Teams from Veneto & Friuli-Venezia Giulia

Girone D 
Teams from Lombardy, Emilia-Romagna,Marche & Umbria

Girone E 
Teams from Liguria, Tuscany & Umbria

Girone F 
Teams from Marche, Umbria, Abruzzo &Molise

Girone G 
Teams from Lazio & Sardinia

Girone H 
Teams from Campania, Apulia & Basilicata

Girone I 
Teams from Campania, Calabria & Sicily

Division winners 
All teams promoted to 2008–09 Serie C2, now called Lega Pro Seconda Divisione

Scudetto Dilettanti

First round 
 Division winners placed into 3 groups of 3
 Group winners and best second-placed team qualify for semi-finals

Group A

Group B

Group C

Semi-finals 
First legs played May 25, 2008; return legs played June 1, 2008

Final 
Played June 9, 2008 in Tolentino, Marche

Winners: Aversa Normanna (H)

Promotion playoffs

Rules 

 Promotion playoffs involved a total of 36 teams; four from each of the nine Serie D divisions (teams placed from 2nd through to 5th with one exception).
 New for 2007–08, the Coppa Italia Serie D winner was directly admitted to the semi-final round. The 2007–08 cup winner was Como. Since they won direct promotion by winning Division B, the semi-final place was given to the losing finalist, Colligiana.
 Since Colligiana finished 2nd in division E, teams finishing 3rd through 6th were admitted to the playoffs in that division.
 The first two rounds were one-legged matches played in the home field of the best-placed team.
 Games ending in ties were extended to extra time. New for the 2007–08 season, the higher classified team was declared the winner if the game was still tied after extra time. Penalty kicks were not taken.
 Round one matched 2nd & 5th-placed teams, and 3rd & 4th-placed teams within each division, except for division E.
 The two winners from each division played each other in the second round.
 The nine winners - one each from the nine Serie D divisions - were then split into three groups of three teams each. Every team played two matches, one against each of the other two opponents within the group. The three group winners qualified for the semifinal round, joining Colligiana.
 The semi-finals were two-legged matches, and the respective winners moved on to play in a one-legged final hosted in a neutral ground.
 The tournament results provided a list, starting with the winner, by which vacancies could be filled in Serie C2, now called Lega Pro Seconda Divisione.
 Ultimately, the top 5 tournament teams all won promotion to Lega Pro Seconda Divisione.

First round 

 Played on May 11 & 12, 2008; single-legged matches played at best placed club home field
 2nd-placed team plays 5th-placed team, and 3rd plays 4th in each division
 Games ending in a tie are extended to extra time, if still tied, the higher-classified team wins

Second round 
 Played May 18,19 & 21, 2008; single-legged matches played at best placed club home field
 One team from each division moves on to third round

Third round 
 group winners qualify for semi-finals

Group A

Group B

Group C

Semi-finals 
First legs played June 8, 2008; return legs played June 14 & 15, 2008

Final 
Played June 22, 2008 in Carpi, P. of Modena

Due to vacancies created in Lega Pro Seconda Divisione, the following five teams were ultimately promoted to play there for the 2008–09 season.

 Sambonifacese as play-off winners
 Colligiana as play-off finalists
 Alghero as semi-finalists
 Montichiari as semi-finalists
 Barletta as best second-placed team in group stage

Tie-breakers 
Girone C - 12th–13th place - played May 11, 2008

Sandonà forced to play in relegation playoffs

Relegation playoffs 
Played May 18 & 25, 2008
In case of aggregate tie score, higher classified team wins
Team highlighted in green saved, other is relegated to Eccellenza

Notes and references

External links 
 2007–08 Serie D at RSSSF

Serie D seasons
5
Italy